The Special Forces Association (SFA) is a non-profit fraternal organization for current and retired U.S. Army Special Forces soldiers, also known as "Green Berets." Established in 1964, the association is based at Fort Bragg, North Carolina, with 84 chapters located in the United States as well as Panama, South Korea, Germany, Thailand, Philippines and Okinawa. Chapters meet in their respective areas and conduct meetings, hold reunions and host social functions for their members.

Membership is open to any person who is or has been a member of Special Forces, including those in the U.S. Army Reserve and Army National Guard. Those wishing to join must apply, providing certified documentation proving past or current assignment with a special forces unit. Associate membership is also available to individuals who do not meet this criterion, but who have "contributed significantly to the support of Special Forces, or its lineage, in the accomplishment of its mission."
 
The Association publishes The Drop, a quarterly magazine providing news and information about its members, and sponsors an annual convention.

Notable members

LTG William P. Yarborough, commander of the US Army Special Warfare Center/School for Special Warfare and "Father of the Modern Green Berets" 
MG John K. Singlaub, OSS/Jedburgh in WW II, MACV-SOG Commander in Vietnam
COL Aaron Bank, founder and first commanding officer of U.S. Army's first Special Forces unit
LTC William Francis Buckley, US Army officer and CIA officer
COL Roger Donlon, Medal of Honor recipient
SSG Franklin D. Miller, Medal of Honor recipient
Robin Moore, author of The Green Berets
MAJ John Plaster, veteran of MACV-SOG and author of The Ultimate Sniper
Martha Raye, entertainer and honorary "Green Beret"
SFC Randall Shughart, Medal of Honor recipient
SGM Billy Waugh, former US Army NCO and CIA officer
SFC Jesse "DOC" Gonzales Look Magazine,

Chapters

Notes

External links

Official SFA website

Special Operations Forces of the United States